The 2013 Korean Basketball League rookie draft (Korean: 2013 KBL 국내신인선수 드래프트) was held on September 30, 2013, at the Jamsil Students' Gymnasium in Seoul, South Korea. Out of the 39 players who participated in the draft, 22 were selected. Changwon LG Sakers won the lottery for the first overall pick.

Draft selections
This table only shows the first twenty picks.

Players
The draft has been dubbed the "Kyung Hee draft" due to the fact that the first three overall picks were from Kyung Hee University, breaking the monopoly of the traditional college basketball "big 3" (Yonsei University, Korea University and Chung-Ang University). Such was the anticipation over the three Kyung Hee University players that disgruntled Changwon LG Sakers fans accused head coach Kim Jin of "giving up on basketball" (intentionally achieving poor results) to finish in a lower position of the 2011–12 league table so that they can qualify for the draft lottery to get an earlier pick, accusations which Kim has denied.

Lee Dae-sung had played college basketball in the NCAA Division II before returning to South Korea. Since he had last played overseas, he did not qualify to be automatically included in the KBL's list of rookies for the draft and joined the draft via the try-out open to amateur players not from a domestic college program, impressing enough to earn a nomination.

Notes

See also
Korean Basketball League draft

References

External links
 Draft: 2013 KBL Domestic Player draft results / 드래프트: 2013 KBL 국내신인선수 드래프트 결과 — Korean Basketball League official website 

Korean Basketball League draft
Korean Basketball League draft
2010s in Seoul
Korean Basketball League draft
Sport in Seoul
Events in Seoul